The Greek diaspora, also known as Omogenia, are the communities of Greeks living outside of Greece and Cyprus (excluding Northern Cyprus). Such places historically include Albania, North Macedonia, parts of the Balkans, southern Russia, Ukraine, Asia Minor, the region of Pontus, Eastern Anatolia, Georgia, the South Caucasus, Egypt, southern Italy, and Cargèse in Corsica. The term also refers to communities established by Greek migration outside of these traditional areas; such as in Australia, Chile, Canada and the United States.

Overview 
The Greek diaspora is one of the oldest diasporas in the world, with an attested presence from Homeric times to the present. Examples of its influence range from the role played by Greek expatriates in the emergence of the Renaissance, through liberation and nationalist movements involved in the fall of the Ottoman Empire, to commercial developments such as the commissioning of the world's first supertankers by shipping magnates Aristotle Onassis and Stavros Niarchos.

History

Antiquity 

In Archaic Greece, the trading and colonizing activities of Greeks from the Balkans and Asia Minor propagated Greek culture, religion and language around the Mediterranean and Black Sea basins. Greek city-states were established in Sicily, southern Italy, Magna Graecia, northern Libya, eastern Spain, the south of France, and the Black Sea coast, and the Greeks founded over 400 colonies in these areas. Alexander the Great's conquest of the Achaemenid Empire marked the beginning of the Hellenistic period, which was characterized by a new wave of Greek colonization in Asia and Africa; the Greek ruling classes established their presence in Egypt, West Asia, and Northwest India.

Many Greeks migrated to the new Hellenistic cities founded in Alexander's wake, as geographically dispersed as Uzbekistan and Kuwait. Seleucia, Antioch and Alexandria were among the largest cities in the world during Hellenistic and Roman times. Greeks spread across the Roman Empire, and in the eastern territories the Greek language (rather than Latin) became the lingua franca. The Roman Empire was Christianized in the fourth century AD, and during the late Byzantine period the Greek Orthodox form of Christianity became a hallmark of Greek identity.

Middle Ages 

In the seventh century, Emperor Heraclius adopted Medieval Greek as the official language of the Byzantine Empire. Greeks continued to live around the Levant, Mediterranean and Black Sea, maintaining their identity among local populations as traders, officials, and settlers. Soon afterwards, the Arab-Islamic Caliphate seized the Levant, Egypt, North Africa and Sicily from the Byzantine Greeks during the Byzantine–Arab Wars. The Greek populations generally remained in these areas of the Caliphate and helped translate ancient Greek works into Arabic, thus contributing to early Islamic philosophy and science (which, in turn, contributed to Byzantine science).

Fall of Byzantium and exodus to Italy 
After the Byzantine–Ottoman Wars, which resulted in the fall of Constantinople in 1453 and the Ottoman conquest of Greek lands, many Greeks fled Constantinople (now Istanbul) and found refuge in Italy. They brought ancient Greek writings that had been lost in the West, contributing to the Renaissance. Most of these Greeks settled in Venice, Florence, and Rome.

Fall of the Empire of Trebizond and exodus to Russia and Georgia 

Between the fall of the Empire of Trebizond to the Ottomans in 1461 and the second Russo-Turkish War in 1828–29, thousands of Pontic Greeks migrated (or fled) from the Pontic Alps and eastern Anatolia to Georgia and other southern regions of the Russian Empire, and (later) the Russian province of Kars in the South Caucasus. Many Pontic Greeks fled their homelands in Pontus and northeastern Anatolia and settled in these areas to avoid Ottoman reprisals after supporting the Russian invasions of eastern Anatolia in the Russo-Turkish Wars from the late 18th to the early 20th century. Others resettled in search of new opportunities in trade, mining, farming, the church, the military, and the bureaucracy of the Russian Empire.

Modern era

Ottoman Empire 

Greeks spread through many provinces of the Ottoman Empire and took major roles in its economic life, particularly the Phanariots (wealthy Greek merchants who claimed noble Byzantine descent during the second half of the 16th century). The Phanariots helped administer the Ottoman Empire's Balkan domains in the 18th century; some settled in present-day Romania, influencing its political and cultural life. Other Greeks settled outside the southern Balkans, moving north in service to the Orthodox Church or as a result of population transfers and massacres by Ottoman authorities after Greek rebellions against Ottoman rule or suspected Greek collaboration with Russia in the Russo-Turkish wars fought between 1774 and 1878. Greek Macedonia was most affected by the population upheavals, where the large, indigenous Ottoman Muslim population (often including those of Greek-convert descent) could form local militias to harass and exact revenge on the Greek-speaking Christian Orthodox population; this often forced the inhabitants of rural districts, particularly in the more vulnerable lowland areas, to abandon their homes.

A larger-scale movement of Greek-speaking peoples in the Ottoman period was Pontic Greeks from northeastern Anatolia to Georgia and parts of southern Russia, particularly the province of Kars Oblast in the southern Caucasus after the short-lived Russian occupation of Erzerum and the surrounding region during the 1828–29 Russo-Turkish War. An estimated one-fifth of Pontic Greeks left their homeland in the mountains of northeastern Anatolia in 1829 as refugees, following the Tsarist army as it withdrew back into Russian territory (since many had collaborated with—or fought in—the Russian army against the Muslim Ottomans to regain territory for Christian Orthodoxy). The Pontic Greek refugees who settled in Georgia and the southern Caucasus assimilated with preexisting Caucasus Greek communities. Those who settled in Ukraine and southern Russia became a sizable proportion of cities such as Mariupol, but generally assimilated with Christian Orthodox Russians and continued to serve in the Tsarist army.

In 1788, Ali Pasha of Ioannina destroyed Moscopole. This predominantly ethnic Aromanian settlement historically had an important Greek influence. This is why some members of the Aromanian diaspora that settled in places such as Vienna in Austria have been considered as Greeks and part of a Greek diaspora as well.

19th century 

During and after the Greek War of Independence, Greeks of the diaspora established the fledgling state, raised funds and awareness abroad and served as senior officers in Russian armies which fought the Ottomans to help liberate Greeks under Ottoman subjugation in Macedonia, Epirus, and Thrace. Greek merchant families had contacts in other countries; during the disturbances, many set up home bases around the Mediterranean (notably Marseilles in France, Livorno, Calabria and Bari in Italy and Alexandria in Egypt), Russia (Odessa and St. Petersburg), and Britain (London and Liverpool) from where they traded (typically textiles and grain). Businesses frequently included the extended family, and they brought schools teaching Greek and the Greek Orthodox Church. As markets changed, some families became shippers (financed through the local Greek community, with the aid of the Ralli or Vagliano Brothers). The diaspora expanded across the Levant, North Africa, India  and the US. Many leaders of the Greek struggle for liberation from Ottoman Macedonia and other parts of the southern Balkans with large Greek populations still under Ottoman rule had links to the Greek trading and business families who funded the Greek liberation struggle against the Ottomans and the creation of a Greater Greece.

The terrible devastation of the island of Chios in the 1822 massacre caused a great dispersion of the islanders, leading to the creation of a specific Chian diaspora.

After the Treaty of Constantinople, the political situation stabilised; some displaced families returned to the newly independent country to become key figures in cultural, educational and political life, especially in Athens. Financial assistance from overseas was channeled through these family ties, providing for institutions such as the National Library and sending relief after natural disasters.

20th century 
During the 20th century, many Greeks left the traditional homelands for economic and political reasons; this resulted in large migrations from Greece and Cyprus to the United States, Australia, Canada, Brazil, The United Kingdom, New Zealand, Argentina, The United Arab Emirates, Singapore, Germany, Norway, Belgium, Georgia, Italy, Armenia, Russia, Philippines, Chile, Mexico and South Africa, especially after World War II (1939–45), the Greek Civil War (1946–49) and the Turkish Invasion of Cyprus in 1974.

After World War I, most Pontian and Anatolian Greeks living in Asia Minor (modern-day Turkey) were victims of Muslim Turkish intolerance for Christians in the Ottoman Empire. More than 3.5 million people, including Greeks, Armenians, Assyrians, Kurds, and Jews, were killed in the regimes of the Young Turks and Mustafa Kemal from 1914 to 1923. Greeks in Asia Minor fled to modern Greece, and the Russian Empire (later the USSR) was also a major destination.

After the Greek Civil War, many communist Greeks and their families fled to neighboring Yugoslavia, the USSR and the Soviet-dominated states of Eastern Europe (especially Czechoslovakia). Hungary founded a village (Beloiannisz) for Greek refugees, and many Greeks were resettled in the former Sudeten German region of northern Czechoslovakia around Krnov (Jägerndorf). Sweden also admitted large numbers of Greeks, and over 17,000 Greek-Swedish descendants live in the country.
Although many immigrants later returned to Greece, these countries still have a number of first- and second-generation Greeks who maintain their traditions.

With the fall of Communism in eastern Europe and the USSR, Greeks of the diaspora immigrated to modern Greece's main urban centers of Athens, Thessaloniki, and Cyprus; many came from Georgia.

Pontic Greeks are Greek-speaking communities originating in the Black Sea region, particularly from the Trebizond region, the Pontic Alps, eastern Anatolia, Georgia, and the former Russian south-Caucasus Kars Oblast. After 1919–23, most of these Pontic Greek and Caucasus Greek communities resettled in Greek Macedonia or joined other Greek communities in southern Russia and Ukraine.

Greek nationality 

Anyone who is ethnically Greek and born outside Greece may become a Greek citizen through naturalization if they can prove that a parent or grandparent was a Greek national. The Greek ancestor's birth and marriage certificates and the applicant's birth certificate are required, along with birth certificates for all intervening generations between the applicant and the person with Greek citizenship.

Greek citizenship is acquired by birth by all persons born in Greece and all persons born to at least one parent who is a registered Greek citizen. People born out of wedlock to a father who is a Greek citizen and a mother who is a non-Greek automatically gain Greek citizenship if the father recognizes them as his child before they turn 18.

Present day 

Centers of the Greek diaspora are New York City, Boston, Chicago, Los Angeles, London, Melbourne, Sydney, Auckland, Montreal, Toronto, Vancouver, Rio de Janeiro, São Paulo, Culiacán Rosales, Mexico City, and Buenos Aires.

The SAE – World Council of Hellenes Abroad has compiled several studies on the Greek diaspora. The total number of Greeks living outside Greece and Cyprus is uncertain. Available census figures indicate about three million Greeks outside Greece and Cyprus, but the SAE estimates about seven million worldwide. The Greek diaspora defends Greek interests, particularly in the US. Assimilation and loss of the Greek language influence the definition of the Greek diaspora. To learn more about how factors such as intermarriage and assimilation influence self-identification among young Greeks in the diaspora, and to help clarify the estimates of Greeks in the diaspora, the Next Generation Initiative began an academically supervised research study in 2008.

United States 

The United States has the largest ethnically-Greek population outside Greece. According to the US Department of State, the Greek-American community numbers about three million and the vast majority are third- or fourth-generation immigrants. According to the World Council of Churches, the Ecumenical Patriarchate has a membership of 600,000 in the US and Canada who are still Greek Orthodox; however, many Greeks in both countries have adopted other religions or become secular. The 2010 census recorded about 130,000 Greek Americans, although members of the community dispute its accuracy.

Canada 

Most Greek Canadians live in Toronto, Montreal and Vancouver. The 2016 census reported that 271,405 Canadians were Greek by ancestry and 16,715 people were born in Greece.

Chile 

Greek immigration to Chile began during the 16th century from the island of Crete. Cretan Greeks settled in the Antofagasta Region in the mid-16th century and spread to other locations, such as the Greek colony in Santiago and the cities of San Diego, Valparaíso, Talcahuano, Puerto Mont, and Punta Arenas.

Australia 

Australia has one of the world's largest Greek communities. Greek immigration to Australia began during the 19th century, increasing significantly in the 1950s and 1960s. According to the 2016 census, there were 397,431 Greeks and Greek Cypriots (by ancestry) living in Australia and 93,740 Greeks born in Greece or Cyprus. According to Greeks around the Globe, Greek Australians number about 700,000. The majority of Greeks in Australia (over 90 percent) are Greek Orthodox and many attend church weekly. According to the SBS, Greeks in Australia have a higher level of church attendance than Greeks in Greece. There are minorities of Catholics, Jehovah's Witnesses and Pentecostals. Currently, there are 152 Greek Orthodox churches in Australia, most under jurisdiction of the Greek Orthodox Archdiocese of Australia. In addition, there are 8 monasteries as well as schools, theological colleges and aged care centres.

Brazil 

About 50,000 Greeks immigrated to Brazil from Greece and Cyprus, with 20,000 in the city of Sao Paulo. Brazil has a sizable community of Antiochean Greeks (known as Melkites), Orthodox, Catholics, and Jews. According to the Catholic Church, the Eparchy of Nossa Senhora do Paraíso em São Paulo (Melkite Greek), the Eparchia Dominae Nostrae Paradisis S. Pauli Graecorum Melkitarum had a 2016 membership of 46,600. The World Council of Churches estimates that the Greek Orthodox Patriarchate of Antioch has a membership of 90,000 in Latin America, the majority of whom live in Brazil.

Israel 

About 250 Non-Jewish Greeks immigrated to Ottoman Palestine and Mandatory Palestine for the service of the Greek-Orthodox church in the country between 1850 and 1920, mostly residing in Jerusalem and Nazareth City. About 1,500-2,500 Ethnic Greeks Today, few were able to obtain Greek Citizenship largely due to the refusal of recognition from Greece.

Mexico 

Greeks started to immigrate to Mexico in the late 1800s from mainland and especially the Greek islands and Cyprus. While there was an individual immigration to Mexico, the Mexican government looked to start olive production in the Pacific Coast so thousands were taken to the state of Sinaloa where the Greeks found fortunes in the tomato production instead. Today there are tens of thousands of Greek-Mexicans living primarily in Culiacán, Veracruz, and Mexico City as well as surrounding areas and other cities.

Demographics

Notable Greeks of the diaspora 
Notable people of the Greek diaspora (including those of Greek ancestry):

Spiro Agnew
Achilles Alferaki
Sofia Adamson
Nikos Aliagas
Leo Allatius
Braith Anasta
Constantine Andreou
The Andrews Sisters
Harry Agganis
Criss Angel
Steve Angello
Jennifer Aniston
John Aniston
E. M. Antoniadi
George Averoff
Kostas Axelos
Marco Basaiti
Dave Bautista
Antonis Benakis
Emmanouil Benakis
George Bizos
Charles Denis Bourbaki
Nick Calathes
Maria Callas
Michel-Dimitri Calvocoressi
Toma Caragiu
Ion Luca Caragiale
Constantin Carathéodory
John Cassavetes
Cornelius Castoriadis
Constantine Cavafy
Kim Cesarion
Jorgo Chatzimarkakis
Chris Chelios
André Chénier
Joseph Chénier
Kelly Clarkson
Constantine II of Greece
Michael Constantine
George Coulouris
Georges Corraface
George P. Cosmatos
Jamie Dimon
Jacques Damala
Mickey Dee
Michael Dertouzos
Michael Dukakis
Nikolaus Dumba
Chris Diamantopoulos
Olympia Dukakis
Tina Fey
Patricia Field
Thomas Flanginis
Mario Frangoulis
Juan de Fuca
Christos Gage
Nicholas Gage
Zach Galifianakis
Nick Galis
Costa-Gavras 
Elias Gyftopoulos
George of Trebizond
Nick Giannopoulos
Alexi Giannoulias
El Greco
Nick Gravenites
Bret Hart
Lafcadio Hearn
José Holebas
Arianna Huffington
John Iliopoulos
Isidore of Kiev
Sir Alec Issigonis
Hugh Jackman
Theodor Kallifatides
Andreas Kalvos
Melina Kanakaredes
Tina Kandelaki
Ioannis Kapodistrias
Alex Kapranos
Herbert von Karajan
Andreas Katsulas
Elia Kazan
Frank Klopas
Vladimir Kokkinaki
Thanasi Kokkinakis
Lampros Kontogiannis
Adamantios Korais
Elias Koteas
Jannis Kounellis
Nick Kyrgios
Jim Londos
Alexi Lalas
Vicky Leandros
Tommy Lee
Francisco Leontaritis
Marina Diamandis
Demetri Martin
Maximus the Greek
Maria Menounos
Enrique Metinides
George Michael
Bartolomé Mitre
Jean Moréas
Nana Mouskouri
Marcus Musurus
Nicholas Negroponte
John Negroponte
Johnny Otis
Alexandros Pallis
Georgios Papanikolaou
Stass Paraskos
Alexander Payne
George Peponis
Mark Philippoussis
Joseph Pilates
Leontius Pilatus
Basil Poledouris
Nicos Poulantzas
Ange Postecoglou
Alex Proyas
Théodore Ralli
Angelique Rockas
Michel Emmanuel Rodocanachi
Athina Onassis Roussel
Demis Roussos
Pete Sampras
Viktor Sarianidi
Telly Savalas
Joseph Sifakis
Marina Sirtis
Nikolaos Skoufas
Spyros Skouras
Olympia Snowe
Queen Sophia of Spain
Jose Manuel Estela Stilianopoulos
Dimitri Soudas
John Stamos
Theodoros Stamos
Dino Stamatopoulos
George Stephanopoulos
Cat Stevens
Demetrio Stratos
Trish Stratus
Patrick Tatopoulos
Theophanes the Greek
Jake Tsakalidis
Athanasios Tsakalov
Paul Tsongas
Emmanuel Tzanes
Panayis Athanase Vagliano
Vangelis
Obdulio Varela
Nia Vardalos
Ioannis Varvakis
John Varvatos 
Laert Vasili
Antonio Vassilacchi
Gregory Vlastos
Emmanuil Xanthos
Iannis Xenakis
Yanni
Milo Yiannopoulos
Fyodor Yurchikhin
Betty White
Rita Wilson
Billy Zane
Frank Zappa
Evangelos Zappas
Konstantinos Zappas
Christian Zervos
Giorgio Tsoukalos
Demetrio B. Lakas
Elli AvrRam

See also 

Greek community of Melbourne
Antiochian Greeks
Cappadocian Greek
Caucasus Greeks
Chian diaspora
Church of Greece
Cypriot Orthodox Church
Ecumenical Patriarch of Constantinople
Ecumenical Patriarchate of Constantinople
Grecheskaya Operatsiya
Greek Australian
Greek American
Greek Byzantine Catholic Church
Greek Canadians
Greek colonies
Greek Muslims
Greek Mexican
Greek Orthodox Church of Alexandria
Greek Orthodox Church of Antioch
Greek Orthodox Church of Jerusalem
Greek-Calabrian dialect
Greeks
Greeks in France
Greeks in Georgia
Greeks in Great Britain
Greeks in New Zealand
Greeks in the Netherlands
Greeks in Russia and the Soviet Union
Swedish Greeks
Griko language
Griko people
Hellenistic civilization
List of Greek Americans
Magna Graecia
Orthodox Church in America
Pontic Greeks
Enclaved Greek Cypriots
Greek Settlement in the Philippines
SAE – World Council of Hellenes Abroad

References

External links 
 General Secretariat for Greeks Abroad
 Greek Ministry of Foreign Affairs
 Centre for Greek Diaspora Studies
 

 
European diasporas